The 2020 season was the New Orleans Saints' 54th season in the National Football League (NFL), their 45th playing home games at the Mercedes-Benz Superdome, and their 14th under head coach Sean Payton. Although they failed to match their 13–3 records from 2018 and 2019, the Saints defended their NFC South title for the fourth consecutive year following a Week 16 victory over the Minnesota Vikings. After beating the San Francisco 49ers in Week 10, they won six straight games for the fourth consecutive season. With a Week 13 win over the Atlanta Falcons, the Saints clinched a franchise record fourth consecutive playoff appearance. After Week 17 victory over the division rival, Carolina Panthers, the Saints became the first NFC South member to sweep the division in its history. During the Wildcard round against the Chicago Bears of the 2020–21 NFL playoffs, the Saints made history as one of the first two teams to air in a post-season football game on Nickelodeon, a primarily children-related network. The Saints would defeat the Bears 21–9, advancing to the divisional round, where they were defeated by division rival and eventual Super Bowl champion Tampa Bay Buccaneers, 30–20, despite having swept them in the regular season.

This season marked the end of the Drew Brees era in New Orleans as he would announce his retirement on March 14, 2021, after twenty seasons of playing in the NFL, fifteen of those with the Saints.

Roster changes

Free agency

Unrestricted

Restricted

Exclusive Rights FA

Signings

Practice squad additions

Released/waived

Practice squad releases

Contract extensions

Retirements

Player trades

Draft

Notes
 The Saints traded their second-round selection (No. 56 overall) to the Miami Dolphins in exchange for the Dolphins' 2019 second-round selection.
 The Saints traded their seventh-round selection, along with their 2019 fourth-round selection to the New York Giants in exchange for cornerback Eli Apple.
 The Saints traded their third-round selection (No. 88 overall) and their 2021 third-round selection to the Cleveland Browns in exchange for the Browns' 2020 third-round selection (No. 74 overall) and the Browns' seventh-round selection (No. 244 overall).
 The Saints traded their fourth-round selection (No. 130 overall), fifth-round selection (No. 169 overall), sixth-round selection (No. 203 overall) and their seventh-round selection (No. 244 overall) to the Minnesota Vikings in exchange for the Vikings' 2020 third-round selection (No. 105 overall).
 The Saints traded their 2021 sixth-round selection to the Houston Texans in exchange for the Texans' 2020 seventh-round selection (No. 240 overall).

Undrafted free agent signings

Staff

Final roster

Preseason
The Saints' preseason schedule was announced on May 7, but was later cancelled due to the COVID-19 pandemic.

Regular season

Schedule
The Saints' 2020 schedule was announced on May 7.

Note: Intra-division opponents are in bold text.

Game summaries

Week 1: vs. Tampa Bay Buccaneers

With the win, the Saints began the year at 1–0 for the second year in a row. This was also the first since the 2009 season in which the team beat Tom Brady.

Week 2: at Las Vegas Raiders

This was the first NFL game in Las Vegas or in the state of Nevada. With the loss, the Saints dropped to 1–1 on the season.

Week 3: vs. Green Bay Packers

With the tough loss, the Saints dropped to 1–2 for the first time since 2017. This also marks their first loss to the Packers since the 2012 season.

Week 4: at Detroit Lions

With this win against Detroit, the Saints improve to 2–2.

Week 5: vs. Los Angeles Chargers

Drew Brees faced his former team for the fourth time in his career. A potential game-winning 50-yard field goal by Chargers kicker Michael Badgley hit the crossbar instead, sending the game into overtime. With 5:08 left in the overtime period, Wil Lutz kicked a 36-yard field goal to take a 30–27 lead. But the night belonged to Marshon Lattimore, who stopped Chargers wide receiver Mike Williams on fourth down to seal the victory for New Orleans. They won despite Michael Thomas being out for a fourth straight game. However, this time, it was due to suspension after an altercation with Chauncey Gardner-Johnson during practice.

Week 7: vs. Carolina Panthers
The Saints meet the Panthers and Teddy Bridgewater in this game. Bridgewater accidentally fell into the Saints sideline, but he reunited with his old friend Drew Brees who did the quarterback sneak earlier. The Saints were still able to beat the Panthers by 3.

Week 8: at Chicago Bears
The Saints meet Chicago again in the regular season at Soldier Field. During the 3rd Quarter, a fight broke out between C.J. Gardner-Johnson and Javon Wims, resulting in flags on the play. This also resulted in Wims getting ejected from the game. Again, the Saints go into overtime and won with a 35-yard field goal, improving them to 5-2.

Week 9: at Tampa Bay Buccaneers
The Saints visit Tom Brady and the Buccaneers at Raymond James Stadium.￼ The Saints scored touchdowns and field goals. This includes those turnovers notched by David Onyemata and Marcus Williams. The Saints beat their rivals by 35 points, marking the second straight season to sweep them in the NFC South division.

Week 10: vs. San Francisco 49ers

Drew Brees suffered a collapsed lung and broken ribs. He would be out until Week 15 against the Chiefs. Despite Brees being injured and sidelined, the Saints held on with the win over the 49ers. It also marked their first victory over San Francisco since the 2016 season.

Week 11: vs. Atlanta Falcons

Taysom Hill made his first start with Drew Brees sidelined with a rib injury. The Saints would defeat the Falcons by 15 points.

Week 12: at Denver Broncos
 This was an easy win due to the fact Drew Lock, Brett Rypien and Blake Bortles were all ineligible to play following Jeff Driskel testing positive for COVID-19 less than 24 hours before the game, which meant the Broncos named practice squad wide receiver Kendall Hinton, who played QB at Wake Forest, as starting quarterback for the game. This was also the Saints' first victory over the Broncos since the 1994 season, which also marks their first road game win and Sean Payton's first win over Denver.

Week 13: at Atlanta Falcons

Taysom Hill threw his first NFL touchdown pass in the first quarter on a 15-yard pass to receiver Tre'Quan Smith. In the end, Matt Ryan tried to throw a game-winning Hail Mary, but the Saints defense stepped up and made the ball drop to the ground. This marked their first sweep against Atlanta since the 2018 season.

Week 14: at Philadelphia Eagles

The Saints nine-game winning streak came to a halt. This also became the first time since the 2015 season to be defeated by the Eagles.

Week 15: vs. Kansas City Chiefs
With the Chiefs being the defending Super Bowl champions, the Saints were unable to beat them. Cameron Jordan became the first Saints player since Brodrick Bunkley (2012), Steve Gleason (2004), and Kyle Turley (2001) to be ejected from the game.

Week 16: vs. Minnesota Vikings
Christmas Day games

The Saints clinched their fourth consecutive division title as Alvin Kamara rushed for six touchdowns, tying a 91-year-old NFL record set by Hall-of-Fame-fullback Ernie Nevers of the Chicago Cardinals.

Week 17: at Carolina Panthers
The Saints, not only beat the Panthers again, but they also became the first team in the NFC South to sweep their division rivals. 

Clay Martin was originally going to officiate this game, but he was hospitalized for COVID-19. Adrian Hill was also unable to officiate this game because he had another game to be in. John Hussey became the referee for this game.

Standings

Division

Conference

Postseason

Schedule

Game summaries

NFC Wild Card Playoffs: vs. (7) Chicago Bears
For the first time since the 2006 season, the Saints meet the Bears in the playoffs. It also marked the first victory against Chicago in the playoffs. It was primarily due to the Saints dominating on both sides of the ball for all four quarters. During a 4th down play, Alex Kemp got confused by misreading Cordarrelle Patterson's uniform number, making Patterson curse on the microphone. This was not only aired on CBS, it was also the first game to be aired on Nickelodeon.

NFC Divisional Playoffs: vs. (5) Tampa Bay Buccaneers
Even though the Saints swept them in the regular season, they would meet the Buccaneers in the playoffs. This was Drew Brees' last game and the Saints would lose to Tom Brady. Jared Cook would fumble at the goal line after catching a pass. In this game, Alvin Kamara lined up at quarterback, flipped it to Emmanuel Sanders, and then to Jameis Winston, who threw a 56-yard touchdown which was paused due to an accidental flag thrown by the officials, which referee Shawn Hochuli acknowledged that James Hurst checked in as eligible and lined up at the end of the line of scrimmage, thus calling back the flag to reward the Saints a score.

References

External links
 

New Orleans
New Orleans Saints seasons
New Orleans Saints
NFC South championship seasons